Water polo was contested for men only at the 1987 Pan American Games in Indianapolis, United States.

Competing teams
Six teams contested the event.

Medalists

References

 Pan American Games water polo medalists on HickokSports

P
1987
Events at the 1987 Pan American Games
1987